Jason Bentley (born July 27, 1970) is an American radio disc jockey of electronic music in Los Angeles, California. On December 1, 2008, Bentley replaced Nic Harcourt as the host of Morning Becomes Eclectic and as Music Director for KCRW.  Previously he had hosted two radio programs: Afterhours on KROQ-FM, and Metropolis on KCRW, the latter for 16 years until November 28, 2008. Bentley and KCRW revived Metropolis in 2013; the show currently airs Saturdays in the 8PM to 10 PM slot.

Bentley's family moved from Boston's Jamaica Plain neighborhood to Santa Monica when he was 13.

Jason began his career at KCRW as a phone volunteer in July 1988.  Jason later attended Loyola Marymount University and worked as a DJ at their college station KXLU. He was recruited by former KCRW Music Director Chris Douridas after a softball game between the two stations in 1991 and he began working at KCRW on-air starting in the summer of 1992.

In 1995 Bentley co-founded the influential Los Angeles club night "bossa:nova" with Bruno Guez, and  George Ghiz. The club began life as an extension of the record label Quango Music Group, an imprint on Island Records, and hosted many well-known DJs from around the world, including Daft Punk, Groove Armada, Kruder & Dorfmeister, Lazy Dog, and Gilles Peterson. Bentley remained a part of the regular "bossa:nova" night until the end of its run in 2008.

In 2004, Bentley was part of a group that successfully lobbied the Recording Academy to add a Best Electronic/Dance Album category to the Grammy Awards.

Bentley collaborated with other artists on remixes, such as Ego Tripping at the Gates of Hell by The Flaming Lips.

He also coordinated music for all three Matrix films, as well as The Animatrix, Matrix video game titles and the film Tron:Legacy.  Other films that include his music credits include City of Industry, The Chronicles of Riddick: Dark Fury, Green Street Hooligans, Shooting Gallery, and DOA: Dead or Alive. In the video game field, he has worked on Full Spectrum Warrior, Destroy All Humans!, and The Matrix: Path of Neo.

Bentley appeared on Season 5 of Top Chef Masters  as a judge of the Quickfire competition held in Episode 4.

On June 13, 2019, Bentley announced that he is relinquishing his duties as KCRW's Music Director and host of Morning Becomes Eclectic after 10 years on August 30 (2019), but will continue hosting the station's mix show Metropolis on Saturday nights.

References

External links
Conversation with Jason Bentley and Danger Mouse – June 21, 2006
 
 KCRW's Metropolis webpage
 Early 1990s Jason Bentley Mixed Tapes
 Jason Bentley at KCRW.com

1970 births
American radio DJs
Living people
Loyola Marymount University alumni